James Thomas Howard Sr. (born August 18, 1954) is a former American football linebacker from Texas Tech University, who played nine seasons in the National Football League. His son, Thomas Howard, played in the NFL as a linebacker for the Oakland Raiders, Cincinnati Bengals and Atlanta Falcons.  The elder Howard wore the jersey number #52 for the Kansas City Chiefs and #59 for the St. Louis Cardinals.  He returned 3 fumble recoveries for touchdowns: one in 1980 against the Denver Broncos, one in 1981  against the Pittsburgh Steelers, and one in 1984 against the New England Patriots.

References

1954 births
Living people
Sportspeople from Lubbock, Texas
Players of American football from Texas
African-American players of American football
American football linebackers
Texas Tech Red Raiders football players
Kansas City Chiefs players
St. Louis Cardinals (football) players
21st-century African-American people
20th-century African-American sportspeople